Atholi may refer to the following places in India:
 Atholi, Kerala, a town in Kerala
 Atholi, Kapurthala, a village in Punjab
 Atholi, Kishtwar, a village in the Paddar valley of Jammu and Kashmir